Flapping in the Middle of Nowhere is a 2014 internationally co-produced drama film written and directed by Nguyễn Hoàng Điệp.

Plot
Huyền is a college student. Her boyfriend, Tùng, works for the city and enjoys illegal cockfighting. They live together in the capital, far away from their families. Tùng always wants to make love with Huyền, which results in Huyền's discovery of pregnancy. The couple, which never has enough money to make ends meet, decides to abort.

Reception
Flapping in the Middle of Nowhere has received mostly favourable reviews from critics. Guy Lodge from Variety wrote "Vietnamese helmer Diep Hoang Nguyen's sly, sensual, politically probing debut is a knocked-up drama with a difference".

Accolades
Venice International Film Festival
 FEDEORA Best Film - won
Ha Noi International Film Festival
 Jury Special Award for Length Film - won
Fribourg International Film Festival
 The Youth Jury and the Exchange Award - won
 Special Mention of International Jury - won
 The Ecumenical Jury Award - won
Three Continents Festival
 Jury Prize - won
International Film Festival Bratislava
 Best Director - won
AFI FEST
 New Auteurs - nominated
Toronto International Film Festival
 Grolsch People’s Choice Award - nominated

References

An Interview with the Director, Nguyễn Hoàng Điệp

External links

2014 films
Vietnamese-language films
Cockfighting in film